Mark A. Moyar (born May 12, 1971) is the former Director of the Office for Civilian-Military Cooperation at the US Agency for International Development. He currently serves as the William P. Harris Chair of Military History at Hillsdale College. He served previously as the Director of the Project on Military and Diplomatic History at the Center for Strategic and International Studies, and has been a Senior Fellow at the Foreign Policy Research Institute and a member of the Hoover Institution Working Group on the Role of Military History in Contemporary Conflict.

Early life
Moyar was born May 12, 1971, in Cleveland, Ohio to Bert and Marjorie Moyar.  He graduated from Hawken School in Gates Mills, Ohio in 1989.

Education
Moyar holds a B.A. summa cum laude in history from Harvard University and a Ph.D. in history from Cambridge University. While a student at Harvard, he wrote for the conservative student newspaper The Harvard Salient. He also played saxophone in the Harvard Jazz Band with legendary saxophonist Joshua Redman.

Accomplishments

His articles on historical and current events have appeared in The New York Times, The Wall Street Journal, and The Washington Post. During his time as a Senior Fellow at the Joint Special Operations University (2013-2015), he published three lengthy studies on special operations—in Colombia, Afghanistan, and Mali: Village Stability Operations and the Afghan Local Police (2014), Countering Violent Extremism in Mali (2015), and Persistent Engagement in Colombia (2014) 

Moyar is the author of the 2006 book Triumph Forsaken: The Vietnam War, 1954–1965. In it he argues that Ngo Dinh Diem was an effective leader. Moyar states that supporting the November 1963 coup was one of the worst American mistakes of the war. The other biggest mistakes according to Moyar were: the failure to cut the Ho Chi Minh trail, and the United States Congress' refusal to support the South Vietnamese government after the 1973 Paris Peace Accords were violated, and the refusal of emergency aid to South Vietnam near the end of the war.

Triumph Forsaken caused a great stir and many opinionated reviews, some negative, as well as some positive. In response to the reactions engendered by the book, Andrew Wiest and Michael J. Doidge edited Triumph revisited : historians battle for the Vietnam War (2010), a collection of detailed reviews of the book by 15 different academic historians. The reviews are attached to responses by Moyar, who challenges the criticism of his work.

Books
Phoenix and the Birds of Prey: The CIA's Secret Campaign to Destroy the Viet Cong (1997) 
Republished in 2007 as Phoenix and the Birds of Prey: Counterinsurgency and Counterterrorism in Vietnam with a foreword by Harry Summers and a new preface and chapter; 
Triumph Forsaken: The Vietnam War, 1954–1965 (2006) 
A Question of Command: Counterinsurgency from the Civil War to Iraq (2009) 
Strategic Failure: How President Obama's Drone Warfare, Defense Cuts, and Military Amateurism Have Imperiled America (2015) 
Aid for Elites: Building Partner Nations and Ending Poverty through Human Capital (2016) 
Oppose Any Foe: The Rise of America’s Special Operations Forces (2017) 
Triumph Regained: The Vietnam War, 1965-1968 (2022)

References

External links
 Book website
 
 Interview on A Question of Command at the Pritzker Military Museum & Library
 Interview on "Triumph Forsaken: The Vietnam War, 1954-1965" on History News Network
 Triumph Forsaken Roundtable h-diplo Roundtable Review

1971 births
Living people
Historians of the Vietnam War
Harvard University alumni
American military historians
American male non-fiction writers
Writers from Cleveland
Alumni of the University of Cambridge
Historians from Ohio